is a Japanese animation studio founded by ex-Sunrise producer Mikihiro Iwata and it is a subsidiary of Sony Music Entertainment Japan's anime production firm Aniplex.

History
The studio was established by SMEJ's animation production division, Aniplex, on May 9, 2005, to animate its anime series and productions. In 2006, it co-produced the original production Zenmai Zamurai, and in October of the same year, established a studio in Asagaya. In the following year, 2007, the studio produced its first series, Ōkiku Furikabutte.

Originally established to oversee the production of only a few of Aniplex's family-oriented series, the studio has since grown and expanded as a full-fledged studio involved in the production of a wide range of media and anime productions and other activities, which it has overseen. The studio has also expanded its international presence, participating in the noted international convention, Anime Expo 2007 (AX 2007), held in Long Beach, California, and having its own panel there.

In 2010, A-1 Pictures worked in collaboration with a joint project of TV Tokyo's anime department and Aniplex called Anime no Chikara for the creation of original anime series. Three anime series were produced that year for the project: Sound of the Sky, Night Raid 1931 and Occult Academy.

In April 2018, A-1 Pictures rebranded its Kōenji Studio as CloverWorks, giving it a unique brand identity, which made it distinguishable from its main Asagaya Studio. On October 1, 2018, CloverWorks separated from A-1 Pictures, although it still remains as a subsidiary under Aniplex.

Productions

Television series

Films

OVAs

Specials

Others

Notes

References

External links
  
 

 
Japanese companies established in 2005
Mass media companies established in 2005
Animation studios in Tokyo
Japanese animation studios
Suginami